Mikalai Barkouski is a Belarusian judoka.

Achievements

References

External links
 

Year of birth missing (living people)
Living people
Belarusian male judoka
21st-century Belarusian people